The 1993 European Amateur Team Championship took place 30 June – 4 July at Golf Club Mariánské Lázně, later renamed Royal Golf Club Mariánské Lázně, 6 kilometres from the Mariánské Lázně town (called Marienbad in German) in the Karlovy Vary Region of the Czech Republic. It was the 18th men's golf European Amateur Team Championship.

Venue 
The hosting Golf Club Mariánské Lázně was later renamed Royal Golf Club Mariánské Lázně. Its first 9-hole course, located 6 kilometres from the Mariánské Lázně town (called Marienbad in German) in the Karlovy Vary Region of the Czech Republic, opened in 1905 and was extended to 18 holes in 1935.

The championship course was set up with par 72 over 6,709 yards.

Format 
Each team consisted of six players, playing two rounds of opening stroke-play qualifying competition over two days, counting the five best scores each day for each team.

The eight best teams formed flight A, in knock-out match-play over the next three days. The teams were seeded based on their positions after the stroke play. The first placed team were drawn to play the quarter final against the eight placed team, the second against the seventh, the third against the sixth and the fourth against the fifth. Teams were allowed to use six players during the team matches, selecting four of them in the two morning foursome games and five players in to the afternoon single games. Games all square at the 18th hole were declared halved, if the team match was already decided.

The eight teams placed 9–16 in the qualification stroke-play formed flight B and the four teams placed 16–20 formed flight C, to play similar knock-out play, with one foursome game and four single games, to decide their final positions..

Teams 
20 nation teams contested the event. Each team consisted of six players.

Players in the leading teams

Other participating teams

Winners 
Team England and team Sweden was tied leaders of the qualifying competition, each with a 1-under-par score of 719, but England declared the winner, with the better total of the two non-counting scores..

There was no official award for the lowest individual score, but individual leader was Henrik Nyström, Sweden, with an 8-under-par score of 136, two strokes ahead of nearest competitor. Nyström shot a new course record by two shots with a score of 65 in his first 18-hole-round.

Team Wales won the gold medal, earning their first title, beating, defending champions and eight time winners, team England in the final 4–3.

France, earned the bronze on third place, after beating Sweden 4–3 in the bronze match

Results 
Qualification round

Team standings

* Note: In the event of a tie the order was determined by the best total of the two non-counting scores of the two rounds.

Individual leaders

 Note: There was no official award for the lowest individual score.

Flight A

Bracket

Final games

Flight B

First round elimination matches

Second round elimination matches

Match for 15th place

Match for 13th place

Match for 11th place

Match for 9th place

Flight C

Final standings

Sources:

See also 

 Eisenhower Trophy – biennial world amateur team golf championship for men organized by the International Golf Federation.
 European Ladies' Team Championship – European amateur team golf championship for women organised by the European Golf Association.

References

External links 

 European Golf Association: Full results

European Amateur Team Championship
Golf tournaments in the Czech Republic
European Amateur Team Championship
European Amateur Team Championship
European Amateur Team Championship